Yarem Qayah-e Olya (also Romanized as Yārem Qayah-e ‘Olyā, Yārem Qayyah-e ‘Olyā, and Yārem Qīyeh-ye ‘Olyā; also known as Jarmi Kaleh, Jermī Qal‘eh, Qeshlaq-e Yāremqayeh, Yarim Ghiyeh, and Yārīm Qīyeh-ye ‘Olyā) is a village in Qaleh Darrehsi Rural District, in the Central District of Maku County, West Azerbaijan Province, Iran. At the 2006 census, its population was 256, in 58 families.

References 

Populated places in Maku County